Záhornice is a municipality and village in Nymburk District in the Central Bohemian Region of the Czech Republic. It has about 400 inhabitants.

Administrative parts
The village of Poušť is an administrative part of Záhornice.

History
The first written mention of Záhornice is from 1225.

Notable people
František Pecháček (1896–1944), gymnast

Gallery

References

Villages in Nymburk District